Hawaii Life is a reality show on HGTV.

Plot
The show follows a company called Hawaii Life Real Estate Brokers as their agents work with different people who move to Hawaii looking to buy a home. The show takes place on one of the four major islands in Hawaii: Hawaii, Maui, Oahu, and Kauai.

Episodes

Season One
2013
Indianapolis to Dreamy Kauai (After landing a job, an Indiana couple drops everything and moves to Kauai.)
Alaska Family Moves to Kauai (Leaving a large Alaskan home, a family of eight seeks a new life on Kauai.)
Upgrade from Colorado to Kauai (A Colorado family looks for a house in Kauai to escape the harsh winters.)
Oregon to Maui for Scuba Fun (After long Oregon winters, a scuba diver moves to Maui to live her passion.)
Washington to Kona, Big Island (Parents with twins upsize and upgrade from Washington to the Big Island.)
Life Swap from Japan to Hawaii (Young family moves from Tokyo to the Big Island to fulfill their dream.)
A Surfer Returns to the Beach (A pro-surfer looks for a home for his growing family & near some big waves.)
Rainy Washington to Sunny Maui (Too many summers in rainy Washington, a couple changes to sunny Maui.)
Rambler Lands on Big Island (Young father has lived everywhere, but wants to settle on the Big Island.)
Moving From Cali To Big Island (Family searches for a Big Island home to enjoy all of Hawaii's activities.)
Multi-generational on Oahu (New parents are looking for a home to fit them and their mother-in-law.)
Maui Home For Hula Dancer (A hula dancer looks for a comfortable home for her and her two children.)
Newlyweds in Honolulu, Oahu (Newlyweds seek their first apartment in Honolulu with island amenities.)

Season Two
2013 - 2014
Goodbye snowy Canada, hello sunny Big Island
A Family moves from Pittsburgh to Princeville in search of a laidback lifestyle
Family Moves from New Hampshire to Kauai to live the classic Hawaii lifestyle and hit the water everyday
A young couple leaves the hustle and bustle of Honolulu seeking the quieter parts of Oahu
A Baltimore couple moves to Hawaii to start exciting new careers in the Big Island
A couple moves from Buffalo to the Big Island in hopes of a change of pace and to live off the land
Former US Air Force Physician relocates his family to Kauai for laidback lifestyle
A single Mother looks for a home for herself and her daughter in Kauai
A young, active couple house hunts in Oahu for a home where they can start a family
Single Mother of three on Oahu looks for a smaller condo in Oahu as her grown kids head off to college
Maui native moves back home after spending a few years on the mainland
A couple searches for their dream home on Maui that would double as a bed and breakfast
So long Florida, Aloha Maui

Season Three
2014
A View From the Big Island
Shipping out to Oahu
Big Move to the Big Island
A Home with a View on Hawaii's Big Island
A Home with Character on the Big Island
Island Hopping and House Hunting
Newlyweds search for a home on Oahu where they can start a family
Navy family moves to Oahu
Empty Nesters search for a house in Oahu to start a new chapter of their lives
A couple is moving to Oahu to continue their photography business
An Outdoorsy Couple from Pennsylvania looks to enjoy the outdoors in Oahu all year long
Young Couple trades in Madison, WI for killer views in Kauai
A fire twirler and his family find a home on the big island

Season Four
2014 - 2015
Young Family Looks to Make Roots in Waikiki
A Hawaii Local Resumes His Search for the Ideal Property
A Local Family Looks to Return to the Beach by Buying a Home Near Maui's North Shore
Longtime Partners Leave Busy Honolulu Life Behind to Find Space on the Big Island
Oklahoma Minister Moves His Wife and 5 Daughters to a Family-friendly Home on Oahu
A Single Mom with an Empty Nest Seeks a New Life in Hilo
Oahu Newlyweds Search for a Bigger Home Where They Can Start Their Family
A Busy Business Traveler Searches for a Home Base on Maui
A Military Family Searches for Their First Home on Oahu
A Single Mother Searches for New Start On Oahu
A Young Couple Seeks Their Own Paradise on the Island Where They Were Married
Soon-to-be-Wed Couple Looks For a Place to Call Home in South Maui
A Young Couple Looking to Expand Their Family Searches for a Home on the Big Island
A Georgian Family Looks to Reconnect With Their Roots on the Big Island of Hawaii

Season Five
A First-time Homebuyer Searches for a Condo on Oahu
A young California Family Makes the Big Move to the Big Island of Hawaii
A Single Sailor Searches for Her First Home on the Island of Oahu
A Young North Dakota Surgeon and Her Husband Search for a Home Near Her New Job on Oahu
A Family of Four Finds the Home of Their Dreams in Oahu's Countryside
A Young Couple Explores Options on Kauai
Finding a First Home Together on Oahu
A Yogini and her Chef Partner Search for a Peaceful Retreat in the Puna District on the Big Island

Season Six
Kauai Locals Buy First Home
Young Couple Relocate to Maui
Oregon Couple Seeks Hawaii Sun
So Cal Family Moves to Kauai
Newlyweds Home Search on Oahu
Couple Starts Business in Kona
Empty-Nesters Move to Kauai
Military Family Moves to Oahu
Back to the Big Island
Texas Family Moves to Maui
Single Mother Moves to Kauai
Couple Moves to the Big Island
From Heat of Arizona to Kauai
Chicagoan and His Dogs Leave Behind Snow for Surf and Sun on Oahu
Perfect Timing for Wisconsin Couple to Move to Oahu
South Florida Couple Hunts for a New Home on the Big Island

Season Seven
A Big Island Native Moves Back Home with His Wife and Three Children
Setting Down Roots on Oahu
Mother and Daughter Ditch Heat in Houston for New Life On Kauai
Military Couple Entering Civilian Life Makes Oahu Home
A Family Finally Takes the Plunge and Makes the Move to Hawaii That They Have Always Dreamed Of
A Father Brings His Family to Lanikai, the Neighborhood He Called Home in His Youth
Free Spirit Flees Wisconsin for Big Island of Hawaii
San Antonio Family Searches for Oahu Home With Mountain Views
A Lover of the Outdoors Starts Next Chapter of Life on the Big Island
Soon-to-Be Parents Look for House on Oahu
Montana Parents of Six Downsize for Cooler Lifestyle on Kauai
California Couple Looks for Lots of Land on Kauai
Police Dispatcher Searches for Her Sanctuary in West Maui
Florida Divers Look for Oahu Home With Ocean Views

Season Eight
From Canada To The Big Island
A Young Couple Looks To Raise Kids In Paradise
Finding A Farm On Maui
Putting Down Roots In Oahu
Getting Back In Shape On Oahu
Outdoor Life On The Big Island
From The Big Apple To Oahu
Living The Dream On Maui
Single And Ready For Oahu
From Seattle To Amazing Maui
Couple Moves To Big Island To Start Family
Mom Follows Family To Oahu

References

2013 American television series debuts
2010s American reality television series
HGTV original programming
Television shows set in Hawaii
Television shows filmed in Hawaii